The 1965–66 season was the 57th year of football played by Dundee United, and covers the period from 1 July 1965 to 30 June 1966. United finished in fifth place in the First Division.

Match results
Dundee United played a total of 43 competitive matches during the 1965–66 season.

Legend

All results are written with Dundee United's score first.
Own goals in italics

First Division

Scottish Cup

League Cup

References

See also
 1965–66 in Scottish football

Dundee United F.C. seasons
Dundee United